Bharata (representing either   or  , and occasionally rendered as Bharat or Bharatha in informal contexts) may refer to:

 Bharata (tribe), mentioned in the Rig Veda
 Bharata, an occasional epithet for the Vedic deity Agni
 Bharata (Mahabharata), a legendary king
 Bharata (Ramayana), a Hindu deity
 Bharata chakravartin, a figure in Jain mythology
 Bharata Muni, an ancient Indian theatrologist and musicologist 
 Bhārata, a term for descendants of any of the figures listed above
 Bhārata, a name for India

See also 
 Bharat (disambiguation)
 Bhārata Mātā, the national personification of India as a mother goddess
 Bharathan (1946–1998), Indian film maker
 Bharathar, a Tamil caste in Tamil Nadu, India
 Mahābhārata, a Sanskrit epic of ancient India
 Baratha (moth), a synonym of genus Mocis